"Like a Cowboy" is a song recorded by American country music artist Randy Houser. It was released in May 2014 as the fourth single from his third studio album, How Country Feels. Houser wrote the song with Brice Long.

Critical reception
The song received a favorable review from Taste of Country, which called it "a pure, unencumbered vocal showcase" and "for country fans who just like to hear a great vocalist at his best." The song was nominated for CMA Song of the Year and earned its RIAA Gold certification for more than 500,000 sales and on-demand stream units.

Music video
The music video was directed by Dustin Rikert and premiered in June 2014. It was filmed at Old Tucson Studios in Tucson, Arizona.

Commercial performance
"Like a Cowboy" debuted at number 57 on the U.S. Billboard Country Airplay chart for the week of June 7, 2014. It also debuted at number 50 on the U.S. Billboard Hot Country Songs chart for the week of June 28, 2014.  The song has sold 452,000 copies in the US as of March 2019.

Charts

Year-end charts

Certifications

References

2013 songs
2014 singles
Country ballads
2010s ballads
Randy Houser songs
BBR Music Group singles
Songs written by Randy Houser
Songs written by Brice Long